In the run up to the 2014 Ukrainian parliamentary election, various organisations carried out opinion polling to gauge voting intention in Ukraine. Results of such polls are displayed in this article.

The date range for these opinion polls are from the previous general election, held on 28 October 2012, to the day the next election was held, on 26 October 2014.

Party vote
Poll results are listed in the table below in reverse chronological order, showing the most recent first. The percentages that overcome the 5% election threshold are displayed in bold, and the background shaded in the leading party's colour. In the instance that there is a tie, then no figure is bolded. The lead column on the right shows the percentage-point difference between the two parties with the highest figures. Poll results use the date the survey's fieldwork was done, as opposed to the date of publication. However, if such date is unknown, the date of publication will be given instead.

References 

Ukraine
2014
2014 elections in Ukraine
Parliamentary elections in Ukraine